Enrique Casaretto (29 April 1945 – 22 June 2020) is a Peruvian footballer. He played in three matches for the Peru national football team from 1969 to 1975. He was also part of Peru's squad for the 1975 Copa América tournament.

References

External links
 

1945 births
2020 deaths
Peruvian footballers
Peru international footballers
Place of birth missing
Association football forwards
Atlético Grau footballers
Club Universitario de Deportes footballers
Atlético Chalaco footballers
Sporting Cristal footballers
Miami Toros players
Peruvian expatriate footballers
Expatriate soccer players in the United States